Phostria dispila is a moth in the family Crambidae. It was described by Jean Ghesquière in 1940. It is found in the former province of Équateur in the Democratic Republic of the Congo.

References

Phostria
Moths described in 1940
Moths of Africa